Rohu's bat (Philetor brachypterus) is a species of vesper bat. It is the only species in the genus Philetor. It is found in Brunei, Indonesia, Malaysia, Nepal, Papua New Guinea, and the Philippines.

References

Vesper bats
Bats of Asia
Bats of Oceania
Bats of Southeast Asia
Bats of Indonesia
Bats of Malaysia
Mammals of Borneo
Mammals of Brunei
Mammals of Nepal
Mammals of Papua New Guinea
Mammals of the Philippines
Mammals of Western New Guinea
Mammals described in 1840
Taxonomy articles created by Polbot
Taxa named by Coenraad Jacob Temminck
Bats of New Guinea